Krowodrza is one of 18 districts of Kraków, located in the western part of the city. The name Krowodrza comes from a village of same name that is now a part of the district. 

Subdivisions of Krowodrza 
Krowodrza is divided into smaller subdivisions (osiedles). Here's a list of them.
 Cichy Kącik
 Czarna Wieś
 Krowodrza
 Łobzów
 Miasteczko Studenckie AGH
 Nowa Wieś

Population

References

External links
 Official website of Krowodrza
 Biuletyn Informacji Publicznej

Districts of Kraków